It Ain't for You, The Badlees debut EP, was recorded in Harrisburg, Pennsylvania, and Hoboken, New Jersey, and mixed by Bret Alexander back at Susquehanna Sound in Selinsgrove, Pennsylvania. It was Alexander's debut as a producer and it featured four, well-crafted, catchy, and energetic songs, each of which could stand alone well as a bar room anthem.

Background
The Badlees derived from the band Bad Lee White, which put out the album What Goes Around in 1988. Soon after there were several shifts within the band, including the addition of Pete Palladino as lead vocalist, with the former lead vocalist, Jeff Feltenberger stepping back to provide harmonies and rhythm guitar.

On October 10, 1990, the band released the EP, which carried the deceptive title of It Ain’t for You. Put in context, the title was actually derived from the more meaningful elder-to-younger monologue of the opening song of the same name; "…It’s too late for me, but it ain’t for you".

The title song starts with a driving acoustic riff by Jeff Feltenberger and gradually builds with Alexander's layered guitars and the precision rhythm of drummer Ron Simasek and interim bass player Ric Stehman, filling in for Steve Feltenberger, who was now in the Marines. The first song also contains an excellent coda crescendo with vocal interplay between lead-singer Palladino and Feltenberger's background high harmonies. Another entertaining song is the closing number, a country-rock-ish, she-done-me-wrong song entitled "The Best Damn Things In Live Are Free". "Last Great Act of Defiance", co-written by Alexander and Mike Naydock, is perhaps the album's best song. It has an eighties-era Springsteen quality about it with a strong, storytelling lyric and precise, rockin' guitar riffs.

Terry Selders, at the time working at Bassment Records in New York City, acted as the de facto manager of the band from afar and put out It Ain't For You on his newly formed independent label, Rite-Off Records. The cover of the album, taken by Ron Simasek, was a shot of an abandoned lot across the street from Terry's apartment building on Christopher Columbus Drive in Jersey City, New Jersey.

Track listing

Personnel
Musicians
 Pete Palladino – Lead vocals
 Bret Alexander – Guitars, keys
 Jeff Feltenberger – Guitars, vocals
 Ric Stehman – Bass
 Ron Simasek – Drums, percussion
Production
 Bret Alexander – Producer, engineer
 Terry Selders - Executive producer
 Greg Frey - Engineer at Waterfront Recording
 Gary Greyhosky - Engineer at The Production Block
 Ron Simasek - Cover photo
 Ken Madsen - Group photo

References

Modern Rock Review Badlees Profile, October 10, 2010
The Badlees Archives by Alan K. Stout
"The Badlees" by Nigel Tuffnel, Pennsylvania Musician Vol. IX #10 (p17), October 1990
"Susquehanna Valley" by Keith Hummel, Pennsylvania Musician Vol.X #2 (p. 19), February 1991
"Badlees Members Stick to Hard-Driving Sound" by Jennifer Danner, Harrisburg Patriot News (p.F8), February 17, 1991

1990 debut EPs
The Badlees albums